

Kung Fu Tai Chi (also commonly known as Kung Fu Magazine) is a United States magazine covering martial arts and combat sports (mainly Chinese Martial Arts). Kung Fu Tai Chi magazine began publication 1992 and is owned by TC Media, Inc. The magazine was started as a quarterly. In 1996 its frequency was switched to bimonthly and in 2000 to monthly. In 2001 it again became a bimonthly magazine. The headquarters is in Fremont, California. In 2009 the magazine started a YouTube account and posts videos on covering the full spectrum of Chinese martial arts and demonstrations.

See also

Inside Kung Fu (magazine)
Black Belt magazine
Journal of Asian Martial Arts

References

External links
 Kung Fu Tai Chi magazine

Bimonthly magazines published in the United States
Magazines established in 1992
Magazines published in California
Martial arts magazines
Monthly magazines published in the United States
Quarterly magazines published in the United States
Sports magazines published in the United States